Breezly and Sneezly is a Hanna-Barbera cartoon series first broadcast on September 16, 1964, as part of The Peter Potamus Show. From 1964 to 1966, 23 episodes were produced, 14 of which were aired on Peter Potamus with the remaining nine aired on The Magilla Gorilla Show.

Plot
Breezly Bruin (voiced by Howard Morris) is a comical, resourceful, polar bear, much like Yogi Bear himself. His friend is Sneezly Seal (voiced by Mel Blanc), a droopy green seal with a perpetual cold whose sneezes pack devastating power. They live in an igloo in the Arctic. Many of their episodes deal with Breezly's ambitious yet ultimately doomed plans to break into the local army camp for various reasons while trying to stay one step ahead of the army camp's leader Colonel Fuzzby (voiced by John Stephenson).

Episode list

 No Place Like Nome
 All Riot on the Northern Front
 Missile Fizzle
 Mass Masquerade
 Furry Furlough
 Bruin Ruin
 Freezing Fleas
 Stars and Gripes
 Armoured Amour
 As the Snow Flies
 Snow Biz
 Unseen Trouble
 Nervous in the Service
 Birthday Bonanza
 Wacky Waikiki
 General Nuisance
 Rookie Wrecker
 Noodnick of the North
 The Fastest Bear in the North
 Snow Time Show Time
 Goat A-Go-Go
 Spy in the Ointment
 An Ill Wind

Cast
 Howard Morris - Breezly Bruin
 Mel Blanc - Sneezly Seal
 John Stephenson - Colonel Fuzzby

DVD release
The episode "All Riot On The Northern Front" is available on the DVD Saturday Morning Cartoons 1960's vol. 1. Saturday Morning Cartoons 1960's vol. 2 has the episode "Missile Fizzle".

Breezly and Sneezly segments are on the MOD release of the complete Peter Potamus Series.

Other appearances
Animatronics of Breezly and Sneezly can be seen among the animatronic Hanna-Barbera characters in the Dexter's Laboratory episode "Chubby Cheese" during Chubby's song.
Breezly makes a cameo in the Harvey Birdman, Attorney at Law episode "Juror in Court".
Breezly and Sneezly will both appear in Jellystone!.

References

External links
 Breezly and Sneezly at Wingnut Toons

Fictional polar bears
Fictional pinnipeds
1960s American animated television series
1964 American television series debuts
1966 American television series endings
American children's animated comedy television series
Animated television series about bears
Animated television series about mammals
English-language television shows
Television series by Hanna-Barbera
Hanna-Barbera characters